Denizli Çardak Airport  is an airport located in Çardak, Denizli Province, Turkey. It is the airport serving the Aegan city of Denizli. The airport is operated by the General Directorate of State Airports, as is the case with many other airports in Turkey.

Airlines and destinations

Traffic statistics

References

External links

 

Airports in Turkey
Buildings and structures in Denizli Province
Transport in Denizli Province